"The Captain of Her Heart" is a song by the Swiss duo Double (Felix Haug and Kurt Maloo) from their debut studio album, Blue (1985). The song is a ballad about a woman who stops waiting for her absent lover to return. The single was an international success, reaching No. 8 on the UK Singles Chart and No. 16 on the Billboard Hot 100, thus making Double the first Swiss act to reach the top 40 on the latter chart.

Background

Keyboardist Felix Haug had recorded a demo melody on his Oberheim synthesizer, "very '80s style", several months before Double went into the studio to record their first album. In the studio, singer Kurt Maloo heard this melody and was interested. The sound engineer suggested Haug play it on a grand piano, instead of '80s-style synthesizer, as a guide for Maloo's vocals. However, when the piano melody was recorded, Maloo wanted it left it the way it was.

Maloo said in 2013, "I wrote the lyrics to the playback in no time in the studio. Like a ghost writer. They were just there out of the blue. It was almost spooky. I never thought the lyrics would touch so many hearts around the world and I’m still overwhelmed from all the positive feedback I get through the internet."

The prominent saxophone on the song was played by Christian Ostermeier.

Reception
In a retrospective review of the song, AllMusic journalist Stewart Mason suggested that the song is "one of the great lost one-hit wonders of the mid-1980s." Mason wrote: "The Swiss duo never managed to capitalize on this song's casual sophistication and melodic grace, but it remains a glorious anomaly."

Music video
There were two different music videos produced for the song. The original Swiss version features the band performing the song in a darkened room. The US version of the video incorporates more of a storyline, with alternating location shots featuring the band members and various female models. A TV program incorporating elements from the US video made the band appear as having four members, with Felix Haug either playing drums or piano depending on the shot, and Kurt Maloo either playing guitar and singing or playing saxophone. Most shots of playing musicians just showed two of them at the same time, but a few were composite and showed all four. The original Swiss video uses a similar idea, but also sometimes makes two incarnations of the same artist appear together and does not attempt at realism. The album cover also represents each artist twice.

Track listings
7-inch single (Polydor)
"The Captain of Her Heart" – 4:02 (Single Version)
"Your Prayer Takes Me Off" (Part II – Dub) – 4:04

7-inch single (A&M)
"The Captain of Her Heart" – 4:02 (Single Version)
"Your Prayer Takes Me Off" (Part II – Dub) – 4:04
			
7-inch single (Metronome)
"The Captain of Her Heart" – 4:35
"Your Prayer Takes Me Off" (Part II – Dub) – 4:04

12-inch maxi single
"The Captain of Her Heart" – 4:35
"Your Prayer Takes Me Off" (Part II – Dub) – 4:04
"Your Prayer Takes Me Off" (Part I) – 6:30

Charts

Weekly charts

Year-end charts

Cover versions
The song has been covered by:
Randy Crawford
Laurent Voulzy
Koto
Roland Kaiser 
Ronnie Jones and Beauty & Deep
Contemporary jazz pianist Duncan Millar offered his take on the song his 2001 album Good to Go.

References

1985 singles
1985 songs
Double (band) songs
Polydor Records singles
A&M Records singles
Metronome Records singles
English-language Swiss songs